Botanical gardens in Denmark have collections consisting entirely of Denmark native and endemic species; most have a collection that include plants from around the world. There are botanical gardens and arboreta in all states and territories of Denmark, most are administered by local governments, some are privately owned.
 Aarhus
 Botanisk Have, Aarhus, Aarhus University
 Aarhus Forestry Botanical Garden, Aarhus Municipality
 Københavns Universitet (University of Copenhagen), Copenhagen
 Botanisk Have, (University of Copenhagen Botanical Garden), Central campus
 Forstbotanisk Have (Forestry Botanical Garden), Charlottenlund, Northern campus
 Arboretet, Hørsholm

References 

Denmark
Botanical gardens